Hans Gruber is a fictional character and the main antagonist of the 1988 action film Die Hard portrayed by Alan Rickman.

Gruber is a cunning thief and criminal mastermind from East Germany who holds the Nakatomi Plaza hostage to steal $640 million in negotiable bearer bonds. His plan is foiled by New York cop John McClane, who happened upon Gruber's plot by mistake. Since his first appearance, Gruber has been cemented as one of the most iconic villains in film history – as well as often being ranked as the greatest action movie villain of all time and one of Rickman's most iconic roles. The villain became so popular with movie fans, the producers introduced his brother, Simon (played by Jeremy Irons), as the primary antagonist of the third film in the franchise – Die Hard with a Vengeance.

Production

Hans Gruber was the first major film role given to Alan Rickman. Rickman was cast after producer Joel Silver saw him during a Broadway run of Les Liaisons Dangereuses. A green screen was used for the now infamous scene of Gruber's death. Rickman was to be dropped 70 feet, and was let go sooner than expected, causing the shocked look of fear on Gruber's face to be genuine. The first shot taken ended up being the one used in the movie. The scene where Gruber pretends to be an escaped hostage named Bill Clay was not originally included in the script, and was added once the production crew discovered that Rickman could pull off a convincing American accent. According to actor Hans Buhringer, who portrayed the criminal Fritz in the film, Rickman researched meticulously to perfect his German accent and was even able to achieve the German-English dialect throughout the film.

Screenwriter Steven E. de Souza wrote the screenplay for Die Hard with the mindset of Gruber being the protagonist of the story. De Souza stated, "If he had not planned the robbery and put it together, Bruce Willis would have just gone to the party and reconciled or not with his wife. You should sometimes think about looking at your movie through the point of view of the villain who is really driving the narrative."

Reception and legacy

Gruber has gone on to become one of the most iconic villains in cinematic history and is often considered one of the greatest. Gruber was listed by Empire magazine as the 17th Greatest Movie Character of All Time out of 100, while John McClane placed 12th on the same list. Gruber also ranked No. 4 on Empire's list of the Greatest Movie Villains of All Time, only being beaten by Darth Vader, The Joker and Loki. Gruber was also selected by the American Film Institute as #46 villain on AFI's 100 Years...100 Heroes & Villains. Gruber was listed by IGN as #14 of their top 100 villains. Gruber would also go on to influence subsequent movie villains such as Howard Payne in Speed, Cyrus "The Virus" Grissom in Con Air, Eric Qualen in Cliffhanger and Ivan Korshunov in Air Force One. 

Due to the popularity of Gruber, actor Alan Rickman ended up being cast as the Sheriff of Nottingham in Robin Hood: Prince of Thieves in 1991, and was subsequently said to be typecast as villainous characters (despite playing other kinds of characters more frequently) until he portrayed the anti-hero Severus Snape in the Harry Potter film series. 

Due to the film and the character's iconic status, Gruber has been referenced multiple times in popular culture. The police-comedy show Brooklyn Nine-Nine makes references to Gruber (and Die Hard itself) quite often, as the character of Jake Peralta cites Die Hard as his favourite film of all time. One episode in particular includes the cast going to the Fox Plaza (which acted as the stand-in for Nakatomi Plaza in the film and where the majority of the film was shot) and re-enacting iconic scenes from the film, including Gruber's death. As well as a Christmas themed episode where Peralta is thrown into a "Die Hard-esque" scenario involving terrorists and hostages. Other shows such as The Office and Friends have also featured references to Gruber. In ABC Show American Housewife they named their family pet pig Hans Gruber.  Gruber's death was also briefly parodied in The Lego Batman Movie in a scene where Alfred Pennyworth seemingly falls to his death. Gruber is also the subject of a parody video done by Funny Or Die in which Gruber negotiates via walkie talkie with Tropic Thunder character Les Grossman, played by Tom Cruise. Gruber is the namesake for Texas-based punk rock band "Hans Gruber and the Die Hards", and was among the bases for the character Artemis Fowl II, the main antagonist of the book series of the same name, described by its author Eoin Colfer as "Die Hard with fairies".

References

Die Hard
Action film villains
Fictional career criminals
Fictional gentleman thieves
Fictional German people
Fictional mass murderers
Fictional crime bosses
Fictional kidnappers
Fictional professional thieves
Fictional thieves
Film characters introduced in 1988
Male film villains